East Central Indiana is a region in Indiana east of Indianapolis, Indiana, and borders the Ohio state line.  The Indiana Gas Boom, which took place during the 1890s, changed much of the area from small agricultural communities to larger cities with economies that included manufacturing.  Companies such as Ball Corporation and Overhead Door once had their headquarters in the region.  Glass manufacturing was the first industry to be widespread in the area, because of the natural gas.  As the glass industry faded, many of the skilled workers became employed at auto parts factories in cities such as Muncie and Anderson.  With the decline of the American automobile industry, East Central Indiana became part of the Rust Belt.  Many communities have been forced to reinvent themselves with a focus on services or a return to agriculture.

Counties 

Blackford
Delaware
Hancock
Henry
Jay
Madison
Randolph
Wayne

County seats 

Anderson (Madison County)
Greenfield (Hancock County)
Hartford City (Blackford County)
Muncie (Delaware County)
New Castle (Henry County)
Portland (Jay County)
Richmond (Wayne County)
Winchester (Randolph County)

Notable small towns

Blackford County
Dunkirk (only a small portion)
Montpelier
Roll
Shamrock Lakes

Delaware County

Albany
Daleville
Eaton
Gaston
Selma
Yorktown

Hancock County
Fortville
Maxwell
McCordsville
New Palestine
Shirley
Spring Lake
Wilkinson

Henry County

Ashland
Blountsville
Cadiz
Corwin
Dunreith
Greensboro
Hillsboro
Kennard
Knightstown
Knox
Lewisville
Middletown
Millville
Mooreland
Mount Summit
Shirley
Spiceland
Springport
Stone Quarry Mills
Straughn
Sulphur Springs
Van Nuys

Jay County
Bryant
Pennville
Redkey
Salamonia
Dunkirk
Portland

Madison County

Alexandria
Chesterfield
Country Club Heights
Edgewood
Elwood
Frankton
Ingalls
Lapel
Markleville
Orestes
Pendleton
River Forest
Summitville
Woodlawn Heights

Randolph County

Farmland
Losantville
Lynn
Modoc
Parker City
Ridgeville
Saratoga
Union City
Winchester

Wayne County
Abington
Boston
Cambridge City
Centerville
Dublin
East Germantown
Economy
Fountain City
Greens Fork
Hagerstown
Middleboro
Milton
Mount Auburn
Spring Grove
Whitewater

Major newspapers 
 The Star Press, Muncie, Indiana
 Palladium-Item, Richmond, Indiana
 The Winchester News Gazette, Winchester, Indiana
 The New Castle Courier Times, New Castle, Indiana
 The Herald Bulletin, Anderson, Indiana
 The Commercial Review, Portland, Indiana

TV stations 
WIPB-TV - PBS station in Muncie, Indiana
WKOI-TV - TBN station in Richmond, Indiana

Radio stations

Anderson

FM stations 
WBKQ 96.7 - Country (licensed to Alexandria)
WGNR 97.9 - Contemporary Christian, Inspirational 
WQME 98.7 - Christian Contemporary (Anderson University)
WIKL 101.7 - Christian Contemporary/K-Love (licensed to Elwood)

AM stations 
WHBU 1240 Talk "News Talk 1240 WHBU"
WGNR 1470 Religious

Muncie

FM stations 
WKMV 88.3 FM - Adult contemporary Christian "K-Love"
WCRD 91.3 FM - Public Radio (Ball State University) "WCRD"
WBST 92.1 FM (Ball State University) NPR Talk, Classical, Jazz "Indiana Public Radio"
WMXQ  93.5 FM Classic Rock "93.5 MAXimum Classic Rock"(licensed to Hartford City)
W231CC 93.9 FM Christian Contemporary (translator of 990 WNAP)
WNAP-LP 99.1 FM - Southern Gospel
W268BJ 101.5 FM Adult contemporary Christian "WJCF" (translator of WJCF-FM Morristown, IN)
W275AJ 102.9FM Simulcast of 1340AM WMUN "Fox Sports Radio"
WLBC  104.1 FM Hot AC "Today's Best Music"
WERK 104.9 FM Classic Hits "104.9 WERK The New Sound"
W291AH 106.1 FM Contemporary Christian (translator of WBCL 90.3 FM in Ft. Wayne)

AM stations
WNAP 990 AM-Christian Contemporary
WMUN 1340 AM-FOX Sports "102.9FM and 1340AM Fox Sports Radio"

New Castle

FM stations 
WKPW 90.7 FM Classic hits "Classic Hits 90.7" (licensed to Knightstown, IN)
WBSH 91.1 FM NPR, Classical, Jazz Indiana Public Radio (licensed to Hagerstown, IN)
WMDH-FM 102.5 FM "Hit Country 102.5" Country Music
WHHC-LP 100.1 FM "Radio 74" Religious

AM stations 
WLTI 1550 AM Classic Country

Richmond

FM stations
WKRT 89.3 MHz - Adult contemporary Christian "K-Love"
WECI 91.5 MHz - Public Radio (Earlham College)
W233AN 94.5 MHz - Contemporary Christian (translator of WJYW Union City) "Joy FM"
W237AT 95.3 MHz - Adult Contemporary Christian, Inspirational "The Path" (translator of WKCD Cederville, OH)
WQLK 96.1 MHz - Country "Kicks 96"
W249BG 97.7 MHz - Contemporary Christian (translator of WJYW Union City) "Joy FM"
WFMG 101.3 MHz - Hot A/C "G 101-3"
W269BP 101.7 MHz - Christian rock "Air 1" (translator of WORI Delhi Hills/Cincinnati, OH)

AM stations
WHON 930 kHz - News/Talk "News Talk 930" (licensed to Centerville)
WKBV 1490 kHz -  ESPN Sports "ESPN 1490"

Winchester

FM stations
WZZY  98.3 FM Classic hits "Star 98.3"

Colleges and universities 

Anderson University (private)
Ball State University (public)
Earlham College (private)
Indiana University East (public)
Ivy Tech Community College of Anderson, Muncie, and Richmond (public)

Public and large private high schools in East Central Indiana

Blackford County
Blackford High School - Hartford City

Delaware County
Cowan High School - Cowan
Daleville High School - Daleville
Muncie Burris High School - Muncie
Wapahani High School - Selma
Wes-Del High School - Gaston
Yorktown High School - Yorktown
Muncie Central High School - Muncie
Muncie South Side High School - Muncie
Delta High School - Eaton

Henry County
Blue River Valley High School - Mr. Summit
Shannondoah High School - Middletown
Tri High - Lewisville
New Castle High School - New Castle
Knightstown High School - Knightstown

Jay County
Jay County High School - Portland

Madison County
Alexandria-Monroe High School-Alexandria
Anderson High School-Anderson
Anderson Preparatory Academy - Anderson
Liberty Christian -Anderson 
Pendleton Heights High School-Pendleton
Lapel High School-Lapel
Frankton High School-Frankton
Elwood Community High School-Elwood

Randolph County
Union High School (Modoc)-Modoc
Randolph Southern High School-Lynn
Winchester Community High School-Winchester
Union City High School-Union City
Monroe Central High School-Parker City

Wayne County Indiana
Hagerstown High School-Hagerstown High School
Lincoln High School-Cambridge City
Centerville High School-Centerville
Richmond High School-Richmond
Northeastern High School-Fountain City

Notes and references
Notes

References

Cited works

External links
 Forge Your Path East Central Indiana
 Region Six: East Central Indiana

Regions of Indiana